Shahe (沙河) may refer to:

 Shahe, Hebei (沙河市), county-level city of Xingtai, Hebei
 Shahe, Liuji (沙河村), a village in Liuji, Dawu County, Xiaogan, Hubei
 Shahe River (Tributary of Xiang River), a left-bank tributary of Xiang River
 Shahe railway station (沙河站), a station on Beijing-Baotou railway and Beijing-Zhangjiakou intercity railway in Beijing
 Shahe station (disambiguation) (沙河站), multiple metro stations in China
 Shahe fen (沙河粉), a type of wide Chinese noodle made from rice

See also
Shahe Town (disambiguation) (沙河镇)
Shahe Subdistrict (disambiguation) (沙河街道)